Ryan Walters (born May 23, 1985) is an American educator and politician who has served as the elected Oklahoma Superintendent of Public Instruction since 2023 and as the appointed Oklahoma Secretary of Education since 2020.

Early career
Walters grew up in McAlester, Oklahoma and attended Harding University before returning to teach at McAlester High School. He was a McAlester Teacher of the Year and finalist for the 2016 State Teacher of the Year.  He was also appointed to the Oklahoma Community Service Commission in 2018 by Governor Mary Fallin and Commission for Educational Quality and Accountability in 2019 by Governor Kevin Stitt. He resigned from McAlester Public Schools in 2019. On May 29, 2019 he was appointed as the Executive Director of Oklahoma Achieves, a nonprofit education organization created by the State Chamber of Oklahoma. By March 2020, Oklahoma Achieves transitioned into an independent nonprofit, Every Kid Counts Oklahoma, with Walters as its executive director.

Oklahoma Secretary of Education
On September 10, 2020, Governor Kevin Stitt nominated Ryan Walters to be Oklahoma Secretary of Education.

On May 2, 2022, The Frontier and Oklahoma Watch reported on a United States Department of Education report which found the Bridge the Gap program Walters oversaw was implemented with few safeguards to prevent fraud or abuse and that federal auditors were investigating the distribution of COVID-19 relief money through the program.

On May 11, Oklahoma House of Representatives Democrats called on Governor Stitt to call for Walters resignation. The Governor's office responded "Secretary Walters is doing a great job fighting for parents’ right to be in charge of their child’s education and advocating for funding students, not government-controlled systems.”

Later in May, Oklahoma newspapers reported that while working as Secretary of Education, Walters remained Executive Director of Every Kid Counts Oklahoma, an Oklahoma education non-profit. Walters was paid approximately $120,000 a year by Every Kid Counts Oklahoma compared to his state salary of $40,000. The Frontier and Oklahoma Watch reported that Every Kid Counts Oklahoma was funded by national school privatization advocates and charter school expansion advocates, such as the Walton Family Foundation and another group founded by Charles Koch.

State Superintendent

2022 campaign

Walters ran for Oklahoma Superintendent of Public Instruction in the 2022 Oklahoma elections. He was endorsed by Governor Kevin Stitt and Texas Senator Ted Cruz. He defeated the Democratic Party's nominee, Jena Nelson, in the general election.

Tenure
Walters resigned from his position at Every Kid Counts Oklahoma the week before his inauguration as Oklahoma Superintendent of Public Instruction.
He was reappointed by Governor Kevin Stitt as Oklahoma Secretary of Education in 2023.

One of Walters first acts as State Superintendent was to instruct the Oklahoma Department of Education to revoke the teaching licenses of two Oklahoma teachers who had been critical of HB-1775, a law that limits teaching concepts around race and gender.

Electoral history

2022

References

1985 births
21st-century American politicians
Harding University alumni
Heads of Oklahoma state agencies
People from McAlester, Oklahoma
Living people
Oklahoma Republicans
Oklahoma Superintendents of Public Instruction
State cabinet secretaries of Oklahoma